Selectin P ligand, also known as SELPLG or CD162 (cluster of differentiation 162), is a human gene.

SELPLG codes for PSGL-1, the high affinity counter-receptor for P-selectin on myeloid cells and stimulated T lymphocytes. As such, it plays a critical role in the tethering of these cells to activated platelets or endothelia expressing P-selectin.

The organization of the SELPLG gene closely resembles that of CD43 and the human platelet glycoprotein GpIb-alpha both of which have an intron in the 5-prime-noncoding region, a long second exon containing the complete coding region, and TATA-less promoters.

P-selectin glycoprotein ligand-1 (PSGL-1) is a glycoprotein found on white blood cells and endothelial cells that binds to P-selectin (P stands for platelet), which is one of a family of selectins that includes E-selectin (endothelial) and L-selectin (leukocyte). Selectins are part of the broader family of cell adhesion molecules. PSGL-1 can bind to all three members of the family but binds best (with the highest affinity) to P-selectin.

Posttranslational modification
PSGL-1 protein requires two distinct posttranslational modifications to gain its selectin binding activity: 
 sulfation of tyrosines 
 the addition of the sialyl Lewis x tetrasaccharide (sLex) to its O-linked glycans

Function

PSGL-1 is expressed on all white blood cells and plays an important role in the recruitment of white blood cells into inflamed tissue: White blood cells normally do not interact with the endothelium of blood vessels. However, inflammation causes the expression of cell adhesion molecules (CAM) such as P-selectin on the surface of the blood vessel wall. White blood cells present in flowing blood can interact with CAM. The first step in this interaction process is carried out by PSGL-1 interacting with P-selectin and/or E-selectin on endothelial cells and adherent platelets.  This interaction results in "rolling" of the white blood cell on the endothelial cell surface followed by stable adhesion and transmigration of the white blood cell into the inflamed tissue.

In mice it seems to be an immune factor regulating T-cell checkpoints, and it could be a target for future checkpoint inhibitor anti-cancer drugs.

PSGL-1 has been shown to bind to VISTA (V-domain Ig suppressor of T cell activation) but this binding only occurs under acidic pH conditions (pH < 6.5) such as can be found in tumor microenvironments (TME). <ref> Nature. 2019 Oct;574(7779):565-570. doi: 10.1038/s41586-019-1674-5. Epub 2019 Oct 23. PMID: 31645726 <ref>

References

Further reading

External links
 

Clusters of differentiation
Receptors